Carex subnigricans is a species of sedge known by the common name nearlyblack sedge.

Distribution
This sedge is native to the western United States from California to Wyoming, where it grows in moist and dry mountain habitat above  in elevation in sub-alpine and alpine flora zones, such as in the High Sierra Nevada.

Description
Carex subnigricans produces stems no taller than about 20 centimeters from a network of thin rhizomes. The thin leaves are rolled tightly and resemble quills. The inflorescence is generally oval and pointed in shape and one or two centimeters long.

External links
Jepson Manual Treatment - Carex subnigricans
USDA Plants Profile: Carex subnigricans
Flora of North America
Carex subnigricans - Photo gallery

subnigricans
Alpine flora
Flora of the Western United States
Flora of California
Flora of the Sierra Nevada (United States)
Flora of the West Coast of the United States
Plants described in 1939
Flora without expected TNC conservation status